DBPL Baradarha Thermal Power Station is a coal-based thermal power plant located in Baradarha in Janjgir-Champa district in the Indian state of Chhattisgarh. The power plant is operated by the Dainik Bhaskar Power Limited.

The coal for the plant is sourced from Dharamjaigarh coal block in Chhattisgarh. The Engineering, procurement and construction contract is given to Bharat Heavy Electricals.

Capacity
It is a 1200 MW (2×600 MW) project.

References

Janjgir-Champa district
Coal-fired power stations in Chhattisgarh
Energy infrastructure completed in 2014
2014 establishments in Chhattisgarh